Slurs related to low intelligence